Not So Dukish is an album recorded by American jazz saxophonist Johnny Hodges featuring performances recorded in 1958 and released on the Verve label.

Reception

The Allmusic site awarded the album 3 stars.

Track listing
All compositions by Johnny Hodges except as indicated
 "M. H. R." (Johnny Hodges, Billy Strayhorn) - 5:58	
 "Broadway Babe" (Hodges, Mercer Ellington) - 2:43	
 "Three and Six" (Strayhorn) - 2:20
 "Not So Dukish" (Jimmy Woode) - 7:51
 "Central Park Swing" (Jimmy Hamilton) - 3:24
 "Preacher Blues" - 8:22
 "Jeep Bounced Back" - 3:35	
 "The Last Time I Saw Paris" (Jerome Kern, Oscar Hammerstein II) - 2:53

Personnel
Johnny Hodges - alto saxophone
Roy Eldridge, Ray Nance - trumpet
Lawrence Brown - trombone
Jimmy Hamilton - clarinet
Ben Webster - tenor saxophone
Billy Strayhorn - piano
Jimmy Woode - bass
Sam Woodyard - drums

References

Johnny Hodges albums
1958 albums
Verve Records albums
Albums produced by Norman Granz